Clash by Night (released in the US as Escape by Night) is a 1963 British crime thriller directed by Montgomery Tully and starring Terence Longdon and Jennifer Jayne.

Plot
A bus transporting criminals from court to prison is held up by crooks who rescue one of their gang. The bus is driven to a deserted farm and all the other occupants of the bus are locked in a barn. To give the gang leader plenty of time to escape, he tells the people - two prison officers, the driver and five prisoners - that the barn has been doused in petrol, and that two gang members will stay behind to guard it; they will set fire to the straw filled building if anyone attempts to escape. The prisoners and officers start to interact, but soon find they may be in danger from yet another source.

Cast 
 Terence Longdon as Martin Lord 
 Jennifer Jayne as Nita Lord 
 Harry Fowler as Doug Roberts 
 Alan Wheatley as Ronald Grey-Simmons 
 Peter Sallis as Victor Lush 
 John Arnatt as Inspector Croft 
 Hilda Fenemore as Mrs. Peel 
 Arthur Lovegrove as Ernie Peel 
 Vanda Godsell as Mrs. Grey-Simmons 
 Richard Carpenter as Danny Watts 
 Mark Dignam as Sydney Selwyn 
 Robert Brown as Mawsley 
 Stanley Meadows as George Brett 
 Tom Bowman as Bart Rennison 
 Ray Austin as the Intruder
 William Simons as one of the guards left outside the barn (uncredited)
 Geoffrey Denton as station sergeant (uncredited)

References

External links
 

1963 films
British crime thriller films
Films directed by Montgomery Tully
1960s prison films
1960s crime thriller films
Films shot at MGM-British Studios
1960s English-language films
1960s British films